Royal Air Force Harlaxton or more simply RAF Harlaxton is a former Royal Air Force station near the village of Harlaxton,  south west of Grantham, Lincolnshire, England.  The airfield was located in a triangle of flat fields midway between Harlaxton Manor (now the University of Evansville's British campus) and the nearby village of Stroxton.

Originally constructed as a Royal Flying Corps aerodrome in November 1916 it closed between the wars, reopening in 1942 as a Royal Air Force flying training establishment until its final closure in 1957.

During the Second World War Harlaxton Manor was requisitioned by the Royal Air Force as the station's officers' mess and later to temporarily house the headquarters of the 1st Airborne Division.

History
The airfield opened in November 1916 as a Royal Flying Corps training aerodrome with three grassed runways laid out in an equilateral triangle, unusually oriented to the north. The aerodrome remained busy throughout the First World War as a flying training establishment with a large number of aircraft present, flying mostly a motley assortment of de Havilland DH marques and Sopwith Camels.

The Royal Flying Corps' No.98 Squadron formed at Harlaxton from elements drawn from the training squadrons.  After training at the station and Old Sarum Airfield the squadron was deployed to France in a day-bombing role flying DH.9s.

 

From 1919, civilian services operated.

The station was mothballed and placed on a care and maintenance basis between the wars. Surveyed in 1937 as a possible fighter airfield for the defence of Nottingham, Leicester and Birmingham it was decided that the terrain was unsuitable for tarmac runways. Instead the grass runways were retained and a major building expansion programme was undertaken.  In 1942 RAF Harlaxton reopened as a satellite field and relief landing ground for the flying training squadron posted to RAF Spitalgate, Grantham under the command of No. 21 (Training) Group RAF.

Harlaxton Manor was requisitioned by the War Department and utilised as the station's officers' mess. In the period ahead of the D-day invasion the manor also housed the Headquarters of the Army's 1st Airborne Division during their detailed preparations.

As the war came to a close the station continued in a satellite and occasional relief landing ground role but now for the flying training facility at RAF Cranwell.  When flying training at Cranwell switched to jet aircraft in the mid-1950s Harlaxton's grass runways were no longer suitable and the RAF station finally closed in 1957.

A Royal Observer Corps aircraft spotting post was located on the north-east perimeter of the airfield during the Second World War and would have been responsible for initiating air raid warnings to the Grantham area during hostilities.  An underground nuclear bunker was built on the same site in the 1960s and was used throughout the Cold War.

The underground post was only abandoned in 1991 when the ROC was stood down and now stands derelict after a fire was started by vandals.

Harlaxton incidents
On 29 January 1945 a USAAF Douglas C-47 Skytrain transport aircraft attempted an emergency landing at Harlaxton and suffered major airframe damage during the incident.  The accident investigators found that the aircraft was damaged beyond repair and it was written off.  The crew suffered only minor injuries and there were no fatalities.

UK bomb disposal teams were having continuing problems dealing with German 2 kilogram butterfly bombs as no examples had been safely dismantled to learn the process.  Whilst dealing with eight that had fallen on RAF Harlaxton and failed to explode, Flight Sergeant Hanford of RAF Bomb Disposal from nearby RAF Digby noticed that the arming rods had not fully withdrawn.  He screwed them back by hand into the fuzes enabling the bomb disposal scientists to dismantle them and use them for instructional purposes.  Hanford was later awarded the British Empire Medal for this feat of extreme bravery.

List of units posted to RAF Harlaxton

The airfield today
Little sign of the airfield remains today, and its runways have been returned to agriculture. The M&E building in the farmyard stands derelict. There are, however, the remains of a standard "Allen-Williams Turret" rotatable anti-aircraft defence installation.

Unlike many former Lincolnshire airfields, no permanent memorial plaque exists. The site is now owned by a company who have restored the air raid shelters and main building and erection of a memorial is planned.

See also
 List of former Royal Air Force stations
 RAF Spitalgate
 Harlaxton, Lincolnshire

References

Citations

Bibliography
Bruce Barrymore Halpenny Action Stations: Wartime Military Airfields of Lincolnshire and the East Midlands v. 2

External links
 Photos of derelict buildings at RAF Harlaxton in October 2007
 Aerial photograph of RAF Harlaxton during the First World War

Royal Air Force stations in Lincolnshire
Royal Air Force stations of World War II in the United Kingdom
Military airbases established in 1916
Military installations closed in 1957
1916 establishments in England
Royal Flying Corps airfields
1957 disestablishments in England